Endeavour is an impact crater located in the Meridiani Planum extraterrestrial plain within the Margaritifer Sinus quadrangle (MC-19) region of the planet Mars. Using Mars Reconnaissance Orbiter data, phyllosilicate-bearing outcrops have been detected along its rim. These minerals may have formed under wet conditions in a low-acidic environment during the early history of Mars. There are raised rim segments to the north, east, and southwest. The rim has become worn, rounded and degraded, with infilling of plains material in a manner similar to the Victoria crater.

When compared to the surrounding plains, the crater floor shows an enhanced spectral signature of basalt and hematite. The interior contains two groups of dune fields. Images taken since 2008 show evidence of changes in some of the associated formations, which may be evidence of active erosion by the martian wind over a period of two to three years. The plains surrounding the rim show evidence of polyhydrated sulfate.

The Mars Exploration Rover-B Opportunity began travelling toward this crater in August 2008, with the rim coming into sight on March 7, 2009, and arriving at the edge on August 9, 2011.

It is noted that the crater has undergone various erosion processes, with wind being one cause.

Nomenclature
The International Astronomical Union named the crater after a town in Canada. The name was approved on 20 October 2008. Due to rules for naming craters, it is officially named after the Canadian town, but the reason this name was proposed was because rover team was using informal nicknames based on a voyage of HMS Endeavour.

An informal working nickname by the Mars mission for the crater was Endeavour, and features of it, are based on the voyage of HM Bark Endeavour, a British Royal Navy research vessel commanded by Lieutenant James Cook on his first voyage of discovery, to Fiji, New Zealand and Australia from 1769 to 1771, using Australian places named by James Cook. Examples include: Cape Dromedary, Point Hicks, Byron Bay, Cape Tribulation, Cape Byron, and Cape York. The purpose of the voyage was to observe the transit of Venus, to accurately measure the distance to the Sun, then to explore lands found on the return journey.

Geology
The crater is understood by the 2010s to have two main rock types, the Shoemaker Formation and the Matijevic Formation. It has been classified as a complex crater and it is thought to be so old many of its features have been worn away. Some questions were raised about the tilt of the rim, however understanding is hampered by a lack of knowledge about Martian impact craters: Endeavour was the largest Martian impact crater up to that time to be studied that closely. An example of the difficulty of studying Mars features is also apparent with Orcus Patera, which has various volcanic, tectonic, or cratering events explanations for its formation. One famous Mars realization was that what was then called Nix Olympica was a volcano, and then renamed Olympus Mons thanks to Mariner 9 orbiter observations in the early 1970s. Endeavour was identified as having clay minerals, as detected from orbit by Mars Reconnaissance Orbiter, which according to theories at that time indicated rock from an older, wetter, time period on Mars. This type of rock is different from what prevails in other areas of surrounding plains.

What is expected to be a fluid-carved gully was identified at Endeavour, probably water. This gully is targeted for exploration by the MER-B rover mission as of October 2016. It reached the gully in 2017 and it was named Perseverance Valley

Mineral map of surrounding

Western rim

Cape York (Mars), at the northern end of the Eastern rim
Greeley Haven (MER-B over-Mars-wintered here)
Matijevic Hill
Odyssey Crater
Shoemaker Ridge
Spirit Point (MER-B reached here in August 2011)
Sutherland Point
Nobby's Head, just below Cape York
Botany Bay, an open area between Cape York and Solander Point
Solander Point
Murray Ridge
Pilinger Point
Widowak Ridge
Ulysses crater 
Cape Tribulation
Marathon Valley
Spirit Mound
Cape Bryon
Perseverance Valley, erosion network in this section of the rim, reached by MER-B in 2017
Cape Dromedary
Point Hicks
Torres Strait (from the end of Point Hicks to Batavia on the southern rim)

The next rim section proceeding counter-clockwise around the crater is Batavia, on the southern end of the whole crater but East of Torres Strait

Western rim mineral map

Western rim elevation

Western rim

Western rim sections from Solander to Marathon

3492 (November 2013)

3500 to 3689 (June 2014)

3728 to 3757 (August 2014) 
Roughly in the center is Ulysses crater, visited by MER-B around Sol 3790 (September 2014)

3750 to 3869 (December 2014)
Ulysses crater is roughly top-center location, visited by MER-B around Sol 3790 (September 2014)

3870 to 4209 (December 2015)

October 2016 (with labels)
Explored in by the MER-B rover, several locations including the crater Spirit of St. Louis with Lindberg Mound, Marathon Valley, Lewis and Clark pass, and Spirit mound among other features on or very near the Western rim

to 4625 (January 2017)

to 4695 (April 2017)
Cape Tribulation and Cape Bryon

Up to 4836 (September 2017)
Throughout 2017, Opportunity worked its way south along the Western rim as it moved towards the gully, which the team named Perseverance Valley in April 2017.

Eastern rim

Opportunity

MER-B has had such new discoveries at the crater, that the rover team compared Endeavour to the equivalent of a second landing site for Opportunity. For example, On sol  (August 22, 2011) the rover began examining Tisdale 2, a large ejecta block. "This is different from any rock ever seen on Mars," said Steve Squyres, principal investigator for Opportunity at Cornell University in Ithaca, New York.

The journey to Endeavour

In August 2008, Mars Exploration Rover-B Opportunity set to reach Endeavour and began a journey towards it.

On March 7, 2009 (sol 1,820), Opportunity first imaged the rim of Endeavour after driving about  since it left Victoria in August 2008. Based on the amount of time it had taken to drive from Victoria, it was estimated that this journey would take over one Martian year (23 months). On May 5, 2010, to avoid hazardous dune fields along the direct path between Victoria and Endeavour, the charted route between the two craters was extended to an estimated 19 kilometers.

On September 8, 2010, it was announced that Opportunity had reached the halfway point of the 19-kilometer journey between Victoria and Endeavour. By June 28, 2011, Opportunity was just under  from landfall at the rim of Endeavour.

On August 4, 2011, Opportunity was only  from the rim of Endeavour, and on August 9, 2011 Opportunity arrived at the west rim near Spirit Point to study outcrops never seen before.

When it arrived it explored the northwest outcrops at Cape York (Mars) of the crater before heading south to Solander Point and the Western rim.

Solander point

Homestake Vein

In December 2011, Opportunity rover discovered a vein of gypsum sticking out of the soil along the rim of Endeavour. Tests confirmed that it contained calcium, sulfur, and water. The mineral gypsum is the best match for the data. It likely formed from mineral-rich water moving through a crack in the rock. The vein is called "Homestake." It could have been produced in conditions more neutral than the harshly acidic conditions indicated by the other sulfate deposits; hence this environment may have been more hospitable for a large variety of living organisms. Homestake is in a zone where the sulfate-rich sedimentary bedrock of the plains meets older, volcanic bedrock exposed at the rim of Endeavour.

Wdowiak Ridge
A view looking north-north west with the Western and Northwest Endeavour segments

Proximity to Schiaparelli landing ellipse
In October 2016 ESA's Schiaparelli lander attempted to re-use the proven Meridiani Planum landing site, with a landing ellipse that kisses the Endeavour crater location where Opportunity was still functioning. This allowed the opportunity for Opportunity to attempt to image the lander during its descent from the surface of Mars. Contact was lost during descent

Proximity to MSL landing site candidates
Two of the seven final landing candidates for MSL were relatively near to Endeavour, one was in Miyamoto (crater) and another was south of Endeavour in southerner Meridiani. Gale (crater) won the selection

Cape Tribulation

MER-B from 2011 to 2016 explored the Western rim of Endeavour, starting at Cape York (Mars) then moving down through Botany Bay to Solander Point, along Murray Ridge moving south to Marathon Valley; in late 2016 it began moving inward to the crater floor: It then moved back to the rim and went south to gully named Perseverance Valley, leaving the Cape Tribulation section, and heading towards Cape Bryon.

Spirit of St. Louis
This crater sits at the Western mouth of Marathon Valley, south Cape Tribulation on the western rim of Endeavour. It was visited by the MER-B Opportunity rover in May 2015.

Above Perseverance Valley by Opportunity
Perseverance Valley is an erosion network in the Cape Bryon section of the Western Endeavour rim. It was named in April 2017 by the MER-B team, which previously referred to it as the gully.

Context

Comparison
Endeavour is about the same size as Valles Caldera in the U.S. State of New Mexico, a volcanic Caldera of the Valles Caldera National Preserve. Endeavour has been compared to the Mars craters' Santa Fe (crater), which is about 20.2 km in diameter, and also to Tooting (crater), which is 27.5 km in diameter.

See also
List of craters on Mars
Geography of Mars
Cape York (Mars) (Point on western ridge where Mars rover Opportunity arrived at in 2011)
Solander Point (Point on western ridge ascended by a Mars rover Opportunity in 2013)
Nearby Locations in Meridiani Planum:
Victoria Crater
Iazu (crater)
Bopolu (crater)
Miyamoto (crater)

References

External links

 Official Mars Rovers website
Opportunity: Iazu Crater profiles (As seen from rim of Endeavour crater)
Endeavour crater as seen during MER-B's approach to the crater with some locations noted around the crater
HiRise Analysis of the Western Rim of Endeavour Crater, Meridiani Planum, Mars: Morphology, Composition and Topography. University of Tennessee
HiRise - search for Endeavour crater related images
HiRise - DTM - North-Central Endeavour Crater
HiRise - DTM - Endeavour Crater Western Rim
DLR - ExoMars Schiaparelli's landing site on Mars 11 August 2016
HRSC Viewer
HiRise image of the western rim
Degradation of Endeavour Crater, Mars

Impact craters on Mars
Mars Exploration Rover mission
Margaritifer Sinus quadrangle